HMAS Koala was a Bar-class boom defence vessel operated by the Royal Australian Navy (RAN) during World War II. She was constructed by Cockatoo Docks and Engineering Company, Sydney, and launched on 14 November 1939. The ship served in Darwin during World War II, and received the battle honour "Darwin 1942–43". She was sold in 1969 and was sunk during the Brisbane floods in 1974.

Citations

References
 http://www.naa.gov.au/naaresources/Publications/research_guides/guides/dockyard/pages/chapter03/koala.htm 

1939 ships
Boom defence vessels of the Royal Australian Navy